The Voi River (Goshi River) is a river in Coast Province, Kenya, East Africa. It originates in the Taita Hills and flows past the town of Voi and through the Tsavo East National Park before emptying into the sea at Kilifi. However, in the dry season only the last (lower) eighty kilometres has water in it.

Aruba Dam
Aruba Dam was built in 1952 across the Voi River. The reservoir created by the dam attracts many animals and water birds.

Mouth
At the mouth of the Voi, the river flows into the Goshi Estuary.  the Goshi Estuary flows into a narrow neck where there is a bridge between the Shauri Moyo beach and Kilifi.

Notes

Rivers of Kenya
Coast Province